Deare is a surname. Notable people with the surname include:

C. R. Deare (1852–1921), South African cricket umpire
John Deare (1759–1798), English sculptor

See also
Dare (name)
Dearie (surname)